The Eraser is the debut solo album by the English musician Thom Yorke, released on 10 July 2006 through XL Recordings. It was produced by Nigel Godrich, the longtime producer for Yorke's band Radiohead.

The Eraser comprises electronic music Yorke recorded between his work with Radiohead in 2004 and 2005. The lyrics express his political concerns; he wrote "Harrowdown Hill" about the death of the British weapons inspector David Kelly, and several songs reference climate change. The cover art, by Radiohead's longtime collaborator Stanley Donwood, was inspired by the legend of King Canute failing to command the ocean, which Yorke likened to government climate policies.

The Eraser debuted at number three on the UK Albums Chart and number two on the American Billboard 200. It was promoted with the singles "Harrowdown Hill", which reached No. 23 on the UK Singles Chart, and "Analyse". The Eraser received mainly positive reviews; critics praised Yorke's vocals and lyrics, but found it weaker than his work with Radiohead. It was named one of the best albums of 2006 by NME, Rolling Stone and The Observer, and was nominated for the 2006 Mercury Music Prize and the 2007 Grammy Award for Best Alternative Music Album. It is certified gold in the UK, Canada and Japan.

The Eraser was followed by a B-sides compilation EP, Spitting Feathers (2006), and a remix album, The Eraser Rmxs (2008). In 2009, to perform the Eraser material live, Yorke formed a new band, Atoms for Peace, with musicians including Godrich and Red Hot Chili Peppers bassist Flea.

Recording
In 2004, after finishing the tour for their sixth album, Hail to the Thief (2003), Radiohead went on hiatus. Radiohead's songwriter, Thom Yorke, began recording The Eraser, his first solo release, with Radiohead's producer Nigel Godrich in late 2004. Work continued throughout 2005 between Radiohead sessions. Yorke told Pitchfork: "I've been in the band since we left school and never dared do anything on my own ... It was like, 'Man, I've got to find out what it feels like,' you know?" The Radiohead guitarist Jonny Greenwood said: "He had to get this stuff out, and everyone was happy [for Yorke to make it] ... He'd go mad if every time he wrote a song it had to go through the Radiohead consensus." In 2005, Yorke appeared on the web series From the Basement, performing songs including the Eraser track "Analyse".

Godrich said that working with Yorke on his solo record was easier than working with Radiohead, as "when we were in a room when it's with Radiohead ... I'm trying to manage a relationship between [Yorke] and the band and it's me butting heads with him and trying to work on behalf of the band." On The Eraser, they were able to "pull in the same direction".

The Eraser was recorded in Radiohead's Oxford studio, Yorke's home, and Godrich's studio at the Hospital Club, London. Yorke wanted to mainly use computers, but still have "life and energy" in the music. To generate ideas, he cut and pasted clips at random from Radiohead's library of original samples, many of which had been created on laptops in hotel rooms as the band toured. He sent fragments to Godrich, who identified passages that could become songs, edited them and returned them to Yorke. Yorke gave the example of "Black Swan", which was a "nine-minute load of bollocks" until Godrich helped him edit it down. Godrich is also credited for extra instrumentation.

To create the title track, Yorke sampled piano chords played by Greenwood and edited them into a new order. "And it Rained All Night" contains a manipulated sample from the Hail to the Thief track "The Gloaming", and "Black Swan" samples a rhythm recorded by guitarist Ed O'Brien and drummer Philip Selway in 2000. Yorke said "Harrowdown Hill" had been "kicking around" during the Hail to the Thief sessions, but could not have worked as a Radiohead song.

Yorke initially intended to create instrumental tracks, but added vocals at Godrich's encouragement. On Radiohead albums, Yorke had altered his voice with layers of reverb and other effects; for The Eraser, Godrich wanted Yorke's voice to be "dry and loud". Yorke found it difficult to write lyrics to loops, saying he could not "react spontaneously and differently every time", so he translated them to guitar and piano and generated new elements in the process. He saved one song recorded in the Eraser sessions, "Last Flowers", for the bonus disc of Radiohead's seventh album, In Rainbows (2007). Another song, "The Hollow Earth", was finished later and released as a single in 2009.

Music and lyrics 
The Eraser features "skittery beats and pattery rhythms" and "minimal post-rockisms". The LA Times wrote that it combined Yorke's laptop electronica with "soulful" political songs. Pitchfork described it as "glitchy, sour, feminine, brooding". Citing inspiration from the 1997 Björk album Homogenic and the electronic music of Boards of Canada and Autechre, Yorke said The Eraser was designed to be heard in an "isolated space – on headphones, or stuck in traffic". In 2019, Uproxx said it was Yorke's "most straightforward" solo album, "the frontman of a famous rock band essentially presenting his latest tunes in the guise of a singer-songwriter record".

David Fricke of Rolling Stone felt the lyrics had an "emotional and pictorial directness, rare for Yorke". "And It Rained All Night" and "Cymbal Rush" address climate change and cataclysmic floods. The lines "No more going to the dark side with your flying saucer eyes / No more falling down a wormhole that I have to pull you out", from "Atoms for Peace", were inspired by an "admonition" from Yorke's partner Rachel Owen. The song title references a 1953 speech by American President Dwight D. Eisenhower. According to The Globe and Mail, "The Clock", influenced by Arabic music, is a "gliding, droning song about losing control while pretending 'that you are still in charge'." "Analyse" was inspired by a blackout Yorke experienced in his hometown, Oxford: "The houses were all dark, with candlelight in the windows, which is obviously how it would have been when they were built. It was beautiful." The album title addresses the "elephants in the room" that "people are desperately trying to erase ... from public consciousness".

Yorke wrote "Harrowdown Hill" about David Kelly, a whistleblower who died after telling a reporter that the British government had falsely identified weapons of mass destruction in Iraq. Kelly's body was found in the Harrowdown Hill woods near Yorke's former school in Oxfordshire. According to The Globe and Mail, the song resembles a love song with a sense of "menace" and "grim political showdown". Yorke was uncomfortable about the subject matter and conscious of Kelly's grieving family, but felt that "not to write it would perhaps have been worse". In an interview with The Observer, he said it was the angriest song he had ever written.

Artwork

The Eraser cover art was created by Stanley Donwood, who also creates Radiohead's artwork. The cover, a linocut titled London Views, depicts a figure standing before London destroyed by flood in imitation of King Canute failing to command the ocean. It was inspired by the 2004 Boscastle flood and an article by environmentalist Jonathan Porritt comparing the British government's attitude to climate change to the Canute legend.

Donwood said: "There was something about this immense torrent washing everything away and the futile figure holding back the wave (or failing to) that worked with the record, especially as we had both seen the flood, just when Thom was starting on the music." He also felt The Eraser was a "very English record", and that the London imagery fit this. The album is packaged as a large foldout containing the CD; Donwood and Yorke wanted to avoid using plastic.

Release 

On 11 May 2006, Yorke posted a link to the official Eraser site on the Radiohead website. Two days later, he wrote in a press release announcing The Eraser: "I have been itching to do something like this for ages. It was fun and quick to do ... Yes, it's a record! No, it's not a Radiohead record." He emphasised that Radiohead were not splitting up and that the album was made "with their blessing". Before the release, "Black Swan" was used in the closing credits of the film A Scanner Darkly. The album leaked online a month before release; Yorke said he regretted not releasing it as a download beforehand.

The Eraser was released on 11 July 2006 by the independent label XL Recordings on CD and vinyl. Yorke said he chose XL because "it's very mellow. There's no corporate ethic. [Major labels are] stupid little boys' games – especially really high up." The album was also released on iTunes. It debuted at number three in the UK Albums Chart and stayed in the top 100 for ten weeks. In the United States, it debuted at number two on the Billboard 200, selling over 90,000 copies in its first week. "Harrowdown Hill" was released as a single on 21 August, reaching number 23 on the UK Singles Chart, followed by "Analyse" on 6 November. The Eraser was followed by a compilation of B-sides, Spitting Feathers, and a 2008 album of remixes by various artists, The Eraser Rmxs. 

In July 2009, Yorke performed solo at Latitude Festival and found it was possible to perform Eraser songs on acoustic instruments. He contacted Godrich with the idea of forming a band to perform The Eraser without sequencers, reproducing the electronic beats with Latin percussion. They formed a new band, Atoms for Peace, with musicians including the Red Hot Chili Peppers bassist Flea. The band performed eight North American shows in 2010, and released an album, Amok, in 2013.

Reception

On the review aggregator site Metacritic, The Eraser has a score of 76/100, indicating "generally favourable reviews". Reviewing The Eraser for NME, Louis Patterson praised Yorke's vocals and wrote: "Some will mourn its lack of viscera; its coldness; its reluctance to rock. But it's yet another revealing glimpse into Yorke's cryptic inner-world, and one that has the courage not to hide its political message in code." Rob Sheffield of Rolling Stone said: "These aren't Radiohead songs, or demos for Radiohead songs. They're something different, something we haven't heard before ... It's intensely beautiful, yet it explores the kind of emotional turmoil that makes the angst of [Radiohead albums] OK Computer or The Bends sound like kid stuff." PopMatters wrote: "The Eraser isn't a masterpiece, but it's much more than solo-project divergence. Yorke has stayed focused and created a tight album that draws on its predecessors without being held to or afraid of them."

In The Guardian, Alexis Petridis wrote that The Eraser "offers a plethora of low-key delights", but "you can't help imagining what it might have sounded like if Yorke had turned it over to Radiohead". The Village Voice praised Yorke's vocals, but found that "without the hooks of his inspirations or [Radiohead's] density, the results offer pleasantries where they could provoke profound unpleasantries". Pitchfork wrote that The Eraser is "strikingly beautiful and thuddingly boring in maddeningly equal measure". Writing in MSN Music, Robert Christgau found the themes "overstated" and the music "tastefully decorated click-and-loop". In 2019, Uproxx named it Yorke's best solo album, saying it "comes closest to having the heft of an actual Radiohead album ... Many of these tracks are as memorable as anything that Radiohead put out at around the same time."

The Eraser was named the 15th-best album of 2006 by NME, the 30th by The Observer, and the 34th by Rolling Stone. It was nominated for the 2006 Mercury Prize and the 2007 Grammy Award for Best Alternative Music Album. It is certified gold in the UK, Canada and Japan.

Track listing

Personnel
Adapted from the album liner notes.
Thom Yorke – music, arrangement
Nigel Godrich – production, arrangement, extra instrumentation, mixing
Stanley Donwood – print
Jonny Greenwood – piano chords on "The Eraser"
Graeme Stewart – engineering
Darrell "MakeMyDay" Thorp – mixing assistance

Charts

Weekly charts

Year-end charts

Certifications and sales

References

2006 debut albums
Albums produced by Nigel Godrich
Thom Yorke albums
XL Recordings albums
Albums about climate change